Ivica Ančić (born October 29, 1979) is a former professional tennis player from Croatia. His younger siblings, Mario and Sanja, were also professional tennis players.

Tennis career
Ančić was born in Split, at the time in SR Croatia, SFR Yugoslavia.
During his career, from 1996 until 2001, Ančić played Challenger and Futures tournaments. He played doubles in two main draw matches at the ATP Tour-level.  

Ančić captured one Futures title, Croatia F1 in 2000 in doubles partnering his brother Mario. 

Ančić's career highest singles ranking was world no. 378, which he reached October 27, 1997.

In September 2011, he became the coach of Dutch tennis player Thiemo de Bakker. He began coaching fellow Croatian Borna Ćorić in September 2016.

Tour titles (1)

Doubles

References

External links

1979 births
Living people
Croatian male tennis players
Tennis players from Split, Croatia